Dejvická Farmers Market is located in Prague near Dejvická Metro Station.  It is open on Saturdays from March until November. Offerings includes fruits, vegetables, bread, pies, juices, and seafood.

References

Website
Market website

Retail markets in the Czech Republic
Economy of Prague